The Anniversary of Lucha Libre in Estado de México Shows is an annual professional wrestling supercard event, scripted and promoted by the Naucalpan, State of Mexico based International Wrestling Revolution Group (IWRG) professional wrestling promotion. The show commemorates the first wrestling show promoted by Adolfo "Pirata" Moreno in the State of Mexico (Estado de México) in December 1962. The show was first held in Arena K.O. Al Gusto and later in Arena Naucalpan built in the location of Arena K.O. Al Gusto some years the show has been combined with shows that commemorate the opening of Arena Naucalpan in December 1977. The earliest confirmed anniversary show took place in 2002, for the 40th anniversary. At times IWRG has promoted one of their annual shows as part of the anniversary celebration, such as the Rey del Ring or Prisión Fatal.

The most recent show celebrated the 56th Anniversary held on  December 2, 2018. The anniversary shows normally features a Lucha de Apuestas ("Bet match") where two or more wrestlers "bet" their wrestling mask or their hair on the outcome of the match.

History
The building at Calle Jardín 19, Naucalpan Centro, 53000 Naucalpan de Juárez, México, Mexico was originally an indoor roller rink for the locals in the late part of the 1950s, known as Cafe Algusto. By the early-1960s the building was sold and turned into "Arena KO Al Gusto" and became a local lucha libre or professional wrestling arena, with a ring permanently set up in the center of the building, holding shows on a regular basis promoted by Adolfo "Pirata" Moreno. The earliest match reports from Arena KO Al Gusto are dated December 12, 1962 with a main event battle royal that featured wrestler-turned-promoter Adolfo Moreno as one of the participants. Promoter Adolfo Moreno began holding shows on a regular basis often, working with other Mexican promotions such as Empresa Mexicana de Lucha Libre (EMLL) or the Universal Wrestling Association (UWA) to bring lucha libre to Naucalpan. In December 1977, Arena Naucalpan was built on the site of Arena K.O. Al Gusto and as the venue of Moreno's shows, including anniversary shows held to commemorate the first show in 1962.

Moreno's promotion, later turned into International Wrestling Revolution Group, usually held at least one major show in December, both to celebrate the anniversary of the promotion as well as the opening of Arena Naucalpan in December 1977 featuring high-profile matches, such as various Lucha de Apuestas ("Bet matches") where wrestlers would risk their wrestling mask or hair on the outcome of the match. In Lucha libre the wrestling mask holds a sacred place, with the most anticipated and prestigious matches being those where a wrestler's mask is on the line, a so-called Lucha de Apuestas, or "bet match" where the loser would be forced to unmask in the middle of the ring and state their birth name. Winning a mask is considered a bigger accomplishment in lucha libre than winning a professional wrestling championship and usually draws more people and press coverage. Losing a mask is often a watershed moment in a wrestler's career, they give up the mystique and prestige of being an enmascarado (masked wrestler) but usually come with a higher than usual payment from the promoter.

Anniversary Lucha de Apuestas losses

Events

Footnotes

References

 
Entertainment events in Mexico
Recurring events established in 1963